

Southbridge Towers is a big housing cooperative development located in the Civic Center neighborhood of Lower Manhattan, New York City. The complex was built between 1961 and 1971 by Tishman Realty & Construction as a subsidized co-op under the Mitchell-Lama housing program. It is situated south of the entrance ramp to the Brooklyn Bridge between Pearl, Gold, Fulton and Frankfort streets.

In October 2005, the cooperative's board of directors voted to undertake a study that could cost up to $25,000 to explore privatization of the building complex.

In September 2014, the residents of Southbridge Towers voted to privatize under the Mitchell-Lama law and reconstitute as a private co-op. The privatization was completed on September 10, 2015.

See also 
 Cooperative Village
 Marcus Garvey Village

References

External links

 Southbridge Towers

Civic Center, Manhattan
Financial District, Manhattan
Condominiums and housing cooperatives in Manhattan
Residential skyscrapers in Manhattan